Michael Vincent Lobo (born 18 June 1976), is an Indian businessperson and politician from Goa. He is a former member of the Indian National Congress and MLA of Goa Legislative Assembly from Calangute. He is also the former Leader of Opposition of Indian National Congress in Goa Legislative Assembly.

He supported the opening of India's first Playboy club in Candolim. Lobo resigned as Member of Legislative Assembly for Calangute under Bhartiya Janta Party. He then joined Indian National Congress and was made a candidate for the 2022 Goa Legislative Assembly election for Calangute.
He then defected to the Bharatiya Janata Party after the elections.

Early life
Michael Vincent Lobo was born on 18 June 1976 to Melchiades Vincent Lobo and Almira Lobo in Mapusa town, North Goa. He obtained a Higher Secondary School Certificate (twelfth grade) in 1993. He is a practising Roman catholic.

Political career
Lobo was a member of one of the two major political parties in India, the Bharatiya Janata Party. The party is the ruling party in Goa. He also served as the president of North Goa BJP.

Lobo contested on the BJP ticket from Calangute Vidhan Sabha constituency (constituency number eight) in the 2012 Goa legislative assembly election. He received a total of 9,891 votes out of 17,751 polled votes, and won against the Indian National Congress candidate and incumbent MLA for Calangute Agnelo Nicholas Fernandes by 1,875 votes. 

He became a member of the Sixth Legislative Assembly of the State of Goa when it was constituted on 7 March 2012. He resigned as a Minister and the Member of Legislative Assembly on 10 January 2022. He joined the Indian National Congress on 11 January 2022 along with his wife.

He is the chairman of the North Goa Planning and Development Authority since 24 May 2012; the authority has jurisdiction over state capital Panaji and Mapusa. In April 2013, he vehemently opposed the proposal for opening India's first Playboy Club at Candolim Beach, Candolim, and said the proposal was "tantamount to promoting prostitution". He declared his intention to go on a hunger strike to protest against the government if it went ahead with the proposal and allowed the Playboy club. The government withdrew its permission under intense opposition from different sectors of the community including sarpanchas, social activists, women's groups and members of the ruling party itself.

He campaigned for the party's candidates in Mangalore during the 2013 Karnataka Legislative Assembly election in April and May 2013, and met the Bishop of the Roman Catholic Diocese of Mangalore Aloysius Paul D'Souza for his endorsement. He is a member of Estimates Committee and Budget Committee in the Government of Goa since 8 August 2013.

On 8 November 2015, Lobo tore down an illegal compound wall being constructed next to a resort in Calangute. The resort owner has also illegally filled up a lowlying paddy field adjacent to his resort near the Calangute church.

Leader of the Opposition, Goa 
As a Congress MLA, he was the Leader of the Opposition in the Goa Legislative Assembly from 31 March 2022 until 10 July 2022.

Defection to BJP
On 14 September 2022, Lobo along with former Chief Minister of Goa and senior Congress leader Digambar Kamat and 6 other Congress MLAs joined Bharatiya Janata Party, after meeting Dr. Pramod Sawant, Chief Minister of Goa.

Personal life
Michael Lobo is married to Delilah Lobo, and together they have two children. Delilah is the current Member of Goa Legislative Assembly of Siolim Assembly constituency. His interests include music, dancing and swimming. He resides in Parra village, Bardez.

References

External links
 Michael Lobo at myneta.info
 Official Website

Living people
1976 births
People from North Goa district
Bharatiya Janata Party politicians from Goa
Indian Roman Catholics
People from Mapusa
Goa MLAs 2012–2017
Goa MLAs 2017–2022
Goa MLAs 2022–2027
Former members of Indian National Congress from Goa